Ruislip Gardens is an area in the London Borough of Hillingdon.

Education
Ruislip Gardens School is situated here.

Transport
Ruislip Gardens tube station is served by the Central line of the London Underground.

Landmarks
The main entrance to RAF Northolt is adjacent to the local tube station in South Ruislip.

References

External links
 Ruislip Online - Ruislip Gardens

Areas of London
Districts of the London Borough of Hillingdon